1. FC Nürnberg played the 1968–69 season in the Fußball-Bundesliga.

Season review
Despite winning the championship at the end of the previous season, coach Max Merkel decided to make significant changes to the squad. Merkel added 13 new players to the first team squad, and several of the club's more experienced players were sold, including Franz Brungs, the team's leading goalscorer in their championship winning season, and Austrian international August Starek.

Nuremberg started the season poorly, losing their opening two games, but soon recovered and spent the next couple of months in a mid-table position. As reigning champions, the club entered the UEFA European Cup, but lost 5–1 on aggregate to Ajax in the first round. Nuremberg began to struggle from November onwards, and went the next ten games without a win, dropping to the bottom of the table. Merkel was sacked on 24 March and replaced by Kuno Klötzer a few weeks later. With Klötzer in charge, Nuremberg went on to win their next three matches, including a victory against eventual champions Bayern Munich. This was followed by two draws, which took the club to 16th (one place above the relegation zone) with one game in the season remaining. This was a match away at 1. FC Köln, who were also in danger of being relegated. Nuremberg were defeated 3–0, confirming their relegation to the Regionalliga as 17th-placed Borussia Dortmund had won their final match.

Aftermath
Nuremberg's relegation came as a major surprise having won the Bundesliga 12 months earlier – former player Max Morlock described the season as being "like a bad dream". They were the first champions of the Bundesliga to be relegated, and did not return to the top flight until 1978. Max Merkel is the figure often blamed for the club's relegation due to the wholesale changes made to the squad during the pre-season, with Horst Leupold later remarking that he "didn't understand why so many new players joined us after we won the title". Defender Ferdinand Wenauer pointed to more sinister reasons, claiming that goalkeeper Jürgen Rynio had been bribed by Borussia Dortmund, although this was never proven.

Match results

Legend

League

Cup

Europe

Player details

Transfers

In

Out

References

1. FC Nürnberg seasons
Nurnberg